Bussy is a surname. Notable people with the surname include:

 Antoine Bussy (1794–1882), French chemist
 Kessya Bussy (born 2001), French footballer
 Sir John Bussy (?–1399), British Member of Parliament
 Chad Bussy, Comedian

See also
Bussey (surname)
De Bussy